A Year and Change is an independent drama film directed by Stephen Suettinger. It was filmed in Maryland in December 2013.

Synopsis 
After drunkenly falling off the roof at a New Year’s house party, Owen decides that it’s time to make some wholesale changes in his life. Over the next year, he re-enters his estranged son’s life, reignites old friendships, quits drinking, and falls in love with Vera, a bank teller and fellow divorcee. All in an attempt to surround himself with a family, subconsciously replacing the one he’d lost prematurely. Owen, a vending machine proprietor, soon finds that sometimes in life you just need a little change.

Cast 
 Bryan Greenberg as Owen
 T.R. Knight as Kenny
 Claire van der Boom as Vera
 Marshall Allman as Victor
 Jamie Hector as Todd
 Kat Foster as Cindy
 Jamie Chung as Pam
 Natasha Rothwell as Angie
 Drew Shugart as Adam
 Dan Thiel as Peter
 Kate Sanford as Aunt Claire
 Woody Schultz as Martin
 Alison Whitney as Melissa
 Laurie Folkes as Meester Wheeler
 Cassidy Thornton as Kimmy
 Walker Babington as Antique Shop Owner
 Cruz Kim as Tim Kim

References

External links 
 
 

2015 drama films
American independent films
Films set in Maryland
Films shot in Maryland
American drama films
2015 films
2015 independent films
2010s English-language films
2010s American films
English-language drama films